The Brisbane Women's Premier League, BWPL, is the first tier of women's senior Football (Association Football) in Brisbane, Queensland and third overall in Australia.

The league saw changes in the 2016 Season with a new sponsor, being known as the Mt. Franklin Women's Premier League, and the introduction of a reserve league. Due to the late changes to the league it will exist with 12 clubs in 2016 and 4 clubs will be relegated and 2 promoted from the newly created Women's Capital League 1.

Current clubs 
The teams for 2021 Season are shown in the table below.

Previous seasons

The teams for 2020 Season are shown in the table below.

Honours

References

Women's Competition Winners 2015

Women's Competition Winners 2013 - 2014

Women's soccer leagues in Australia